Benjamin C. Freakley (born 21 August 1953) is a retired United States Army lieutenant general. From Woodstock, Virginia, Freakley was commissioned as an infantry officer in 1975, and served in Operation Desert Storm, Operation Iraqi Freedom, and Operation Enduring Freedom – Afghanistan before retiring in 2012. After leaving active duty military service, he joined the McCain Institute and Arizona State University.

Early life
Originally from Woodstock, Virginia, he graduated from Central High School in Woodstock in 1971. Freakley also became an Eagle Scout. Applying for admission to two senior military colleges (Virginia Military Institute, The Citadel) and West Point, he ended up graduating from West Point with the Class of 1975.

Military career
Being commissioned as a second lieutenant of infantry in 1975, he was assigned to the 506th Infantry Regiment until 1979. He then was an aide-de-camp to the commanding general of the Military District of Washington, before being sent to West Germany to serve with the 2nd Battalion, 30th Infantry Regiment. During Operation Desert Shield, Freakley worked on the war plans, and served as battalion executive officer of the 3rd Battalion, 7th Infantry Regiment. Operation Desert Storm found him serving as the operations officer of the 1st Brigade of the 24th Infantry Division.

After Operation Desert Storm, Freakley commanded the 1st Battalion of the 5th Cavalry Regiment, before serving in staff positions with the 24th Infantry Division and III Corps, until being placed in command of the 3rd Brigade of the 1st Cavalry Division. 1999 found Freakley commanding the operations group at Fort Irwin's National Training Center, before serving in staff positions at the National Military Command Center and Joint Staff.

In 2003, Freakley served as assistant division commander, under David Petraeus, of the 101st Airborne Division, which found Freakley involved in combat in Iraq a second time during Operation Iraqi Freedom. After Iraq, Freakley became the Chief of Infantry at Fort Benning, during which time the Infantry Center became part of the Maneuver Center of Excellence.

In 2005, Freakley commanded the 10th Mountain Division as it was deployed to Afghanistan, where he also became the commanding general of Combined Joint Task Force-76. In 2007, Freakley took command of  Accessions Command, where he remained until he retired in 2012.

Post-military career
After retiring from the army, Freakley became a professor at Arizona State University, and special advisor to the university's president.

Awards and decorations
Freakley has received the following awards:

Freakley was also named the policy leader of the year, by the National Association of State Boards of Education in 2010.

References

External links

 
 LinkedIn profile

1953 births
United States Army personnel of the War in Afghanistan (2001–2021)
Arizona State University faculty
Living people
People from Woodstock, Virginia
Recipients of the Defense Superior Service Medal
Recipients of the Distinguished Service Medal (US Army)
Recipients of the Legion of Merit
United States Army Command and General Staff College alumni
United States Army generals
United States Army War College alumni
United States Military Academy alumni